Seticosta niveonigra is a species of moth of the family Tortricidae. It is found in Venezuela.

The wingspan is 20 mm. The ground colour of the forewings is white with grey dots. The hindwings are white, tinged with cream and strigulated (finely streaked) with greyish in the apex area.

Etymology
The species name refers to the colouration of the forewings and is derived from Latin nivaeus (meaning white) and niger (meaning black).

References

Moths described in 2006
Seticosta